John Bacon (April 5, 1738 – October 25, 1820) was a member of the United States House of Representatives from Massachusetts.

John Bacon was born in Canterbury in the Connecticut Colony on April 5, 1738. Upon graduating from Princeton College he spent some time preaching in Somerset County, Maryland. On September 25, 1771, he and Mr. John Hunt were appointed as colleague pastors over the Old South Church in Boston, Massachusetts. Bacon ran into difficulties with his congregation over doctrinal issues and his preaching style, which was described as "argumentative... approaching the severe." He was dismissed from the Old South Church on February 8, 1775.

After leaving the church Bacon moved to Stockbridge, Massachusetts. He was a charter member of the American Academy of Arts and Sciences. He served as a Magistrate, Representative, Associate and Presiding Judge of the Common Pleas, Member and President of the State Senate, and Member of Congress.

Bacon married Elizabeth, the widow of Alexander Cumming and daughter of Ezekiel Goldthwait, Register of the Deeds for Suffolk County, and died in Stockbridge, Massachusetts, October 25, 1820.  Bacon is interred in the Stockbridge Cemetery.

References

External links
 

1738 births
1820 deaths
Fellows of the American Academy of Arts and Sciences
People from Canterbury, Connecticut
People from Stockbridge, Massachusetts
Princeton University alumni
Massachusetts lawyers
Members of the Massachusetts House of Representatives
Massachusetts state senators
Massachusetts state court judges
Democratic-Republican Party members of the United States House of Representatives from Massachusetts
19th-century American lawyers